Quarter Gunner John Davis (died 17 November 1863) was an American sailor who fought in the American Civil War. He was honored with the award on 3 April 1863.

Biography
Davis was born in the Cedarville section of Lawrence Township, Cumberland County, New Jersey. He enlisted into the United States Navy from New Jersey. Davis died in the New York City Naval Hospital on 17 November 1863 (possibly due to his injuries) and was buried at an unknown location.

Medal of Honor citation

See also

List of American Civil War Medal of Honor recipients: A–F

References

1863 deaths
People of New Jersey in the American Civil War
People from Lawrence Township, Cumberland County, New Jersey
Union Navy officers
United States Navy Medal of Honor recipients
American Civil War recipients of the Medal of Honor
Year of birth missing
Union military personnel killed in the American Civil War